Garry John Purdham (20 October 1978 – 2 June 2010) was an English professional rugby league player and farmer. He was killed in the 2010 Cumbria shootings.

Career
Purdham began his professional rugby league career in 1999 with Whitehaven. There he played alongside his brother Rob Purdham.

In 2005 Purdham transferred to the nearby club Workington Town. He struggled with a recurring knee injury at Workington and ultimately required four operations in six years.

Purdham retired from professional rugby league after the 2008 season; however, he returned in 2009 to play amateur rugby league for Egremont Rangers.

Death

On 2 June 2010, Purdham was working with his uncle mending a wire fence on his father's farm near the Red Admiral Hotel at Boonwood, near Gosforth when he was shot and killed. He became the ninth murder victim of spree killer Derrick Bird, who killed 12 people and injured 11 others that day before committing suicide.

In honour of Purdham and the other Cumbria victims, one minute's silence was observed before every rugby league match played in England on the weekend of 5–6 June 2010.

The Workington club has announced that a memorial in honour of Purdham will be established.  His funeral and cremation were held on 10 June 2010, attended by over 600 mourners.

Family
Purdham is survived by a wife and two children. He was the brother of Rob Purdham, a former player with Harlequins RL who played for England five times.

Obituaries
BBC
(archived by web.archive.org) The Rugby Football League
Workington Town
(archived by archive.is) Harlequins Rugby League

References

External links
Garry Purdham Memorial Trust

1978 births
2010 deaths
Deaths by firearm in England
English rugby league players
Male murder victims
Mass murder victims
Rugby league players from Whitehaven
Rugby league second-rows
Whitehaven R.L.F.C. players
Workington Town players